Cheung Chau North was one of the constituencies in the Islands District in Hong Kong.

The constituency returns one district councillor to the Islands District Council, with an election every four years. The seat is currently held by Lee Kwai-chun of the Democratic Alliance for the Betterment and Progress of Hong Kong.

Cheung Chau North constituency is loosely based on the northern part of the island of Cheung Chau with an estimated population of 11,082.

Councillors represented

Election results

2010s

2000s

1990s

1980s

References

Cheung Chau
Constituencies of Hong Kong
Constituencies of Islands District Council
1982 establishments in Hong Kong
Constituencies established in 1982
2019 disestablishments in Hong Kong
Constituencies disestablished in 2019